Arisaema section Nepenthoidea is a section of the genus Arisaema.

Description
Plants in this section have tuberous underground stems, trifoliolate or pedate leaves. Brownish, olive-green spathe that opens earlier than leaves.

Distribution
Plants from this section are found from Southwest China, India, Nepal, Bhutan, and Myanmar.

Species
Arisaema section Nepenthoidea comprises the following species:

References

Plant sections